Rouvikonas  (Rubicon, in Greek Ρουβίκωνας) is an activist anarchist collective in Athens, Greece. It was formed in 2013 in the mid of Greek financial crisis and has since carried more than 50 acts. Most acts have been of low significance against high-profile targets, such as paint throwing, smashing glasses, attacking ATMs and occupying monuments. There have been acts in which Rouvikonas effectively acted as a vigilante group.

Police sources are estimating that there are approximately 120–150 members as of 2018 Mode of action and open membership is in sharp contrast with previous anarchist groups that used indiscriminate violence. Rouvikonas is based in Exarcheia, a district traditionally accommodating anarchists and anti-authoritarians.

References

Sources

External links
 Official Website 

Anarchist organizations in Greece